Heather Miller-Koch (born March 30, 1987) is an American track and field athlete who represents the Central Park Track Club. She participates in multi events, the pentathlon and heptathlon.

High school
Miller graduated in 2005 from Columbus High School in Columbus, Wisconsin.

College
St. Cloud State University alum captured the 2010 NCAA Division II indoor track and field title in the pentathlon.

The St. Cloud State Huskies alumna is a 10-time All-American, having won NSIC titles during her college career in the indoor 60 meter hurdles (2009 and 2010), indoor triple jump (2009 and 2010), indoor pentathlon (2010), outdoor triple jump (2009 and 2010), outdoor long jump (2010) and outdoor heptathlon (2010).

Miller broke Northern Sun Intercollegiate Conference records in the indoor pentathlon and outdoor heptathlon. Heather's heptathlon record was broken by Bree Woeber at Northern Sun Conference Championships at Augustana University in 2016.

Professional
Miller-Koch is a part-time operating room nurse, specializing in orthopedic surgery at United Hospital in St. Paul, Minnesota.

She finished ninth in the heptathlon at the 2012 United States Olympic Trials (track and field) and qualified to represent Team USA. Miller finished fifth in the 2012 Thorpe Cup.

Miller finished fifth in the heptathlon scoring 5945 points in the 2013 USA Outdoor Track and Field Championships in Des Moines, Iowa and qualified to represent Team USA in the Thorpe Cup for the second consecutive year.

Miller finished fourth in the heptathlon at the 2014 USA Outdoor Track and Field Championships in Sacramento, California, scoring 6100.

Miller-Koch finished fourth in the heptathlon at the 2015 USA Outdoor Track and Field Championships in Eugene, Oregon, scoring 6274.
 
Miller-Koch finished second and scored a personal best 6423 points in the heptathlon to join Team USA teammates Barbara Nwaba and Kendell Williams at the 2016 United States Olympic Trials (track and field) and represented the United States at Athletics at the 2016 Summer Olympics – Women's heptathlon, finishing 18th.

References

External links 
 
 

1987 births
Living people
Sportspeople from Madison, Wisconsin
American heptathletes
American female hurdlers
American female high jumpers
Pan American Games silver medalists for the United States
Pan American Games medalists in athletics (track and field)
Athletes (track and field) at the 2015 Pan American Games
St. Cloud State University alumni
St. Cloud State Huskies
Athletes (track and field) at the 2016 Summer Olympics
Olympic track and field athletes of the United States
Medalists at the 2015 Pan American Games
21st-century American women